Ugandan Sign Language (USL) is the deaf sign language of Uganda. Uganda was the second country in the world to recognize sign language in its constitution, in 1995. A Ugandan Sign Language Dictionary has been published. However, knowledge of USL is primarily urban, as access to education for the rural deaf remains poor. Nonetheless, USL is a highly valued element of group identity among the deaf community. 

The first Ugandan schools for the deaf opened in 1962, and several sign languages are reported to have merged in 1988, when sign was allowed in the classroom. This suggests that USL may be a creole of the local languages that the deaf students created informally in the different schools. There were also influences from ASL, BSL, and Kenyan Sign Language, the first two from the language of instruction in early classrooms, and the latter from deaf Ugandans who went to Kenya for higher education. 

Both the British two-handed manual alphabet and the American manual alphabet are used, with minor modifications. Finger-spelling and initialized signs using both alphabets are common among people who learned USL formally as children. Mouthing is also common with abbreviated syllables from both English and Luganda.

It is unclear if USL is related to Rwandan Sign Language.

References

Dorothy Lule and Lars Wallin, 2010, "Transmission of Sign Languages in Africa". In Brentari, ed, Sign Languages. Cambridge University Press.

External links 
 Signs for family relationships in USL
 Common signs in USL

Sign language isolates
Languages of Uganda